Reuben Humphreys  (born 1866) was a Welsh international footballer. He was part of the Wales national football team, playing 1 match on 3 March 1888 against Ireland. At club level, he played for Druids.

See also
 List of Wales international footballers (alphabetical)

References

1866 births
Welsh footballers
Wales international footballers
Druids F.C. players
Place of birth missing
Date of death missing
Association footballers not categorized by position